12th New York Film Critics Circle Awards
January 9, 1947(announced December 30, 1946)

The Best Years of Our Lives
The 12th New York Film Critics Circle Awards, announced on 9 January 1947, honored the best filmmaking of 1946.

Winners
Best Film:
The Best Years of Our Lives
Best Actor:
Laurence Olivier - Henry V
Best Actress:
Celia Johnson - Brief Encounter
Best Director:
William Wyler - The Best Years of Our Lives
Best Foreign Language Film:
Open City (Roma, città aperta) • Italy

References

External links
1946 Awards

1946
New York Film Critics Circle Awards, 1946
1946 in American cinema
1946 in New York City